Paul Holmes may refer to:
 Paul Holmes (broadcaster) (1950–2013), New Zealand radio and television broadcaster
 Paul Holmes (Chesterfield MP) (born 1957), British politician
 Paul Holmes (Eastleigh MP) (born 1988), British politician
 Paul Holmes (academic), American priest and academic
 Paul Holmes (footballer) (born 1968), English footballer
 Paul Holmes (director), British film maker 
 Paul K. Holmes III (born 1951), American lawyer and federal judicial nominee
 Paul Holmes, British singer/songwriter, member of the band Deuce